The United States Virgin Islands general election was held on 4 November 2014. Voters chose the non-voting delegate to the United States House of Representatives, all fifteen seats in the Legislature of the Virgin Islands, and the Governor of the United States Virgin Islands.

Governor

Governor John deJongh was term-limited and could not seek a third term in office in 2014. Kenneth Mapp went on to win the election after a run off, defeating Donna Christian-Christensen in a landslide with almost 64% of the vote.

U.S. House of Representatives

Donna Christian-Christensen did not seek re-election to her delegate seat to run for Governor of the United States Virgin Islands. Stacey Plaskett went on to win the general election with 90% of the vote.

Legislature of the Virgin Islands

All fifteen seats in the Legislature of the Virgin Islands were contested.

Election results

References